Claudia María Cabezas Damasiewicz (born 8 May 2001) is a Spanish footballer who plays as a midfielder for Primera División club Rayo Vallecano.

Club career
Cabezas made her senior debut for Rayo Vallecano on 4 September 2021 as an 88th-minute substitution in a 0–5 Primera División away loss to Atlético Madrid.

Personal life
Born in Spain, Cabezas is also of Polish descent.

References

External links

2001 births
Living people
Spanish women's footballers
Women's association football midfielders
Rayo Vallecano Femenino players
Primera División (women) players
Spanish people of Polish descent
Primera Federación (women) players
Footballers from Madrid